Martinair operated passenger services to these destinations at closure of all passengers services on 29 October 2011.

Destinations at closure

References

Lists of airline destinations